Martin Jurtom (born 11 March 1994) is an Estonian professional basketball player for BC Tallinna Kalev of the Latvian–Estonian Basketball League. Standing at 2.00 m (6 ft 7 in), he plays at the power forward and small forward positions.

References

External links
Martin Jurtom at basket.ee
Martin Jurtom at fiba.com
Profile at Eurobasket

1994 births
Living people
Basketball players from Tallinn
Estonian men's basketball players
Power forwards (basketball)
Small forwards
Korvpalli Meistriliiga players
BC Tallinn Kalev players
Rapla KK players
BC Rakvere Tarvas players
BC Valga players
Lega Basket Serie A players
New Basket Brindisi players
A.S. Junior Pallacanestro Casale players
Estonian expatriate basketball people in Italy